The Rising Star cave system (also known as Westminster or Empire cave) is located in the
Recreational caving has occurred there since the 1960s. Fossils found (starting in 2013) in the cave were, in 2015, proposed to represent a previously unknown extinct species of hominin named Homo naledi.

Names

In the 1980s, the names "Empire", "Westminster", and "Rising Star" were used interchangeably.

The species's name, naledi (Sesotho for "star"), and the "Dinaledi Chamber" (incorporating the Sotho word for "stars") were so named by members of the Rising Star Expedition in reference to the species and chamber's location in Rising Star Cave.

A portion of the cave, used by the excavation team en route to the Dinaledi Chamber, is called "Superman's Crawl" because most people can fit through only by holding one arm tightly against the body and extending the other above the head, in the manner of Superman in flight.

The Superman Crawl opens into the "Dragon's Back Chamber," which includes an approximately 15 m (49 foot) exposed climb up a ridge of a sharp-edged dolomite block that fell from the roof sometime in the distant past. This block is the so-called Dragon's Back, so named because the climbing route appears to progress from the tail to the head along the spiked spine of a mythical beast.

History
Geologists think the cave in which the fossils were discovered is no older than three million years.

The cave was explored in the 1980s by the Speleological Exploration Club (SEC), a local branch of the South African Speleological Association (SASA).

Discovery of fossils in "Dinaledi Chamber"

On 1 October, photos of the site were shown to Pedro Boshoff and then to Lee Berger, both of the University of the Witwatersrand.

The arrangement of bones, as well as several survey pegs, suggested "someone had already been there" as recently as a few decades earlier. The appearance of limited fossilisation initially led the explorers to think the bones were from the last caver into the chamber, who had subsequently never made it back out alive.

2013 and 2014 excavations
Berger organized an expedition to excavate the fossils, which started on 7 November 2013. The expedition was funded by the South African National Research Foundation and the National Geographic Society.

The excavation team enlisted six paleoanthropologists, all of whom were women, who could pass through an opening only 18 cm (7 inches) wide to access the Dinaledi Chamber. Those chosen were Hannah Morris, Marina Elliott, Becca Peixotto, Alia Gurtov, Lindsay Eaves, and Elen Feuerriegel. They have since been nicknamed the Underground Astronauts.

The Dinaledi Chamber was assigned the designation  (or ) and was excavated by these six members of the Rising Star Expedition during November 2013. More than 1,200 fossil elements were recovered and catalogued in November 2013, representing at least a dozen individuals. Only 20 out of 206 bones in the human body were not found in the cave as of Summer 2014.  By April 2014, between two localities, 1,754 specimens were recovered.

The layered distribution of the bones [in clay-rich sediments] suggests that they had been deposited over a long period of time, perhaps centuries. Only one square meter of the cave chamber has been excavated; other remains might still be there.

On 20 February 2014, Rick Hunter, Lee Berger, John Hawks, Alia Gurtov, and Pedro Boshoff returned to Rising Star to evaluate a second potential site.

, fossils of at least fifteen individuals, amounting to 1,550 specimens, had been excavated from the cave. About 300 bone fragments were collected from the surface of the Dinaledi Chamber, and about 1,250 fossil specimens were recovered from the chamber's main excavation pit, Unit 3. The fossils include skulls, jaws, ribs, teeth, bones of an almost complete foot, of a hand, and of an inner ear. The bones of both old and young individuals, as well as infants, were found.

The 15 partial skeletons, which were found in a small underground chamber, invite speculation on the circumstances of their location. Paleoanthropologist John D. Hawks, from the University of Wisconsin-Madison, who is a member of the team, has stated that the scientific facts are that all the bones recovered are hominin, except for those of one owl; there are no signs of predation, and there is no predator that accumulates only hominins this way; the bones did not accumulate there all at once. There is no evidence of rocks or sediment having dropped into the cave from any opening in the surface; no evidence of water flowing into the cave carrying the bones into the cave. Hawks concluded that the best hypothesis is that the bodies were deliberately placed in the cave after death, by other members of the species. Berger et al. suggest that "these individuals were capable of ritual behaviour." They speculate the placing of dead bodies in the cave was a ritualistic behaviour, a sign of symbolic thought. "Ritual" here means an intentional and repeated practice (disposing of dead bodies in the cave), and not implying any type of religious ritual. This hypothesis has been criticised for its improbability.

A study involving the statistical reconstruction of hominin evolutionary trees from skull and tooth measurements, originally indicated that the most likely age for H. naledi was 912 kya.

 

A collaborative workshop involving 54 local and international scientists took place in May 2014 at the University of the Witwatersrand, On 10 September 2015, the fossils were publicly unveiled and given the name Homo naledi.

Dating
The fossils of the Dinaledi chamber have been dated to between 335,000 and 236,000 years ago, long after much larger-brained and more modern-looking hominins had appeared. Geologists estimate that the cave in which the fossils were discovered is no older than three million years, and the ages for flowstone where the fossils were recovered from was interpreted to be deposited between 236,000 and 414,000 years ago.

Geology
The Rising Star cave system lies in the Bloubank River valley, 2.2 km west of Sterkfontein Cave. It comprises an area of 250 × 150 m of mapped passageways situated in the core of a gently west dipping (17°) open fold, and it is stratigraphically bound to a 15–20 m-thick, stromatolitic dolomite horizon in the lower parts of the Monte Christo Formation. This dolomite horizon is largely chert-free but contains five thin (<10 cm) chert marker horizons that have been used to evaluate the relative position of chambers within the system. The upper contact is marked by a 1–1.3 m-thick, capping chert unit that forms the roof of several large cave chambers. The height above sea level is 1,450 m for the Dinaledi Chamber's floor.

See also
 Dawn of Humanity (2015 PBS film)
 Gondolin Cave

References

External links

 Geological map and cross-section of the Rising Star cave system
 The National Geographic 'Rising Star Expedition' Blog
 Series of videos on 'Rising Star Expedition' by John S. Mead

Archaeological sites in South Africa
Caves of South Africa
Limestone caves
Landforms of Gauteng
Paleoanthropological sites
South African heritage sites
Archaeological sites of Southern Africa